Mill Road Halt railway station was a station between Elsenham and Henham in Essex. It closed in 1952.

References

External links
 Mill Road Halt station on navigable 1946 O. S. map
 

Disused railway stations in Essex
Former Great Eastern Railway stations
Railway stations in Great Britain opened in 1922
Railway stations in Great Britain closed in 1952
Henham